Kyle Larson is an American racing driver.

Kyle Larson or Larsen may refer to:

Kyle Larson (American football) (born 1980), American football punter
Kyle Larson, participated in Rowing at the 2008 Summer Olympics – Qualification
Kyle Larsen, American contract bridge player

See also
Karl Larsen (disambiguation)
Larsen (surname)